The 1969 Boston University Terriers football team was an American football team that represented Boston University as an independent during the 1969 NCAA College Division football season. The Terriers compiled a 9–2 record and outscored opponents by a total of 233 to 131.

Larry Naviaux was the team's head coach. Naviaux played college football at Nebraska and had also been an assistant football coach at Boston University. He was named as the head coach in July 1969 after former head coach Warren Schmakel was promoted to assistant athletic director.

Schedule

References

Boston University
Boston University Terriers football seasons
Boston University Terriers football